The Olympus Camedia 765 Ultra Zoom is a 4.0 megapixel camera with a 10x optical zoom manufactured by Olympus starting in 2004. It is powered by a lithium-ion battery.

References

External links

C-765
Cameras introduced in 2004